The following list includes current and some of the former arenas that have been used by the teams that have played in the EuroLeague. Other information included in this list are: arena locations, seating capacities and years opened.

Current arenas
Season 2022/23

Previous seasons

External links
  

A